Sarah Dalsgaard Paulsen (born 27 August 1997 in Hedensted) is a Danish handball player who plays for Molde Elite. 

In 2018 she replaced Sonja Frey on the Cercle Dijon Bourgogne.

References

Danish female handball players
1997 births
Living people
People from Hedensted Municipality
Viborg HK players
Sportspeople from the Central Denmark Region